The Triennial Act 1641 (16 Cha. I c. 1), also known as the Dissolution Act, was an Act passed on 15 February 1641, by the English Long Parliament, during the reign of King Charles I. The act required that Parliament meet for at least a fifty-day session once every three years. It was intended to prevent kings from ruling without Parliament, as Charles had done between 1629 and 1640. If the King failed to call Parliament, the Act required the Lord Chancellor to issue the writs, and failing that, the House of Lords could assemble and issue writs for the election of the House of Commons. Clause 11 was unusual because it explicitly stated that this Bill would receive the royal assent before the end of the parliamentary session. At that time, Bills did not customarily gain royal assent until after the end of the Session. Thus, if Clause 11 had not been present, the Act might not have come into force until the next parliament.

In 1664, it was repealed by the Triennial Parliaments Act 1664 (16 Cha. II c. 1). Though the new Act kept the requirement that a parliament be called at least once in three years, there was no mechanism to enforce this requirement. Thus, Charles II was able to rule for the last four years of his reign without calling a parliament.

Under the Triennial Act 1694, also known as the Meeting of Parliament Act 1694 (6 & 7 Will. & Mar. c. 2), Parliament met annually and held general elections once every three years. The country now remained in a grip of constant election fever (ten elections in twenty years) and loyalties among MPs were difficult to establish, which increased partisanship and rivalry in Parliament. This state of political instability is often known as the 'Rage of Party'. In 1716, the Septennial Act was passed, under which a parliament could remain in being for up to seven years. This Act ushered in a period of greater stability in British politics, with long-lasting parliaments and governments typical throughout much of the 18th century.

References

Further reading

1641 in law
1664 in law
1694 in law
17th century in England
Acts of the Parliament of England
Acts of the Parliament of England still in force
Election legislation
Election law in the United Kingdom
Acts of the Parliament of the United Kingdom concerning the House of Lords